Below is a list of newspapers in the Netherlands.

Newspapers in the Netherlands are issued every day, with the exception of Sunday and some general holidays. The total number of printed daily newspapers is 28 in 2018, down from 35 in 2009. Of the 27 dailies in 2019, 10 are national, 16 regional and 1 local. Some of the regional newspapers offer editions for smaller regions, as does the national Algemeen Dagblad for its readers in South Holland and Utrecht.

National dailies 
The number of national daily newspapers in the Netherlands was 108 in 1950, 38 in 1965, 10 in the 2010s, 9 since March 2020, and 8 since March 2021.

 Circulation data was for 2017, the last year precise numbers were published. For 2019, a list is available that does not control for returned newspapers. Since, only exposure is published, not separating print from online.
 Het Financieele Dagblad is in Berliner format, others in tabloid.

Regional dailies 

 All titles are paid and in tabloid format.
 Circulation data is for 2017.

Local dailies 

 Other local dailies (or small region newspapers) are distributed as part of regional newspapers.
 Paid, except for the free Thursday issue of Barneveldse Krant
 Circulation data is for 2017.
 Tabloid format

References

Bibliography
 
 

Dutch-language newspapers
Netherlands
 
Newspapers